Mount Neustruyev (also known as Gora Neustruyeva) is a peak in East Antarctica, 2,900 m, standing 5 mi NNE of Gneiskopf Peak in Südliche Petermann Range, Wohlthat Mountains, Queen Maud Land.

Discovery and naming
Mount Neustruyev was discovered and plotted from air photos by the Third German Antarctic Expedition (1938–1939), led by Capt. Alfred Ritscher. Mapped from air photos and surveys by Sixth Norwegian Antarctic Expedition, 1956–60; remapped by Soviet Antarctic Expedition, 1960–61, and named after the Soviet geographer S.S. Neustruyev (1874–1928).

See also
 List of mountains of Queen Maud Land

References

External links
 United States Geological Survey, Geographic Names Information System (GNIS)
 Scientific Committee on Antarctic Research (SCAR)

Mountains of Queen Maud Land
Princess Astrid Coast